Hugo Hay (born 28 March 1997 in Bressuire) is a French middle- and long-distance runner. He represented his country at the 2021 European Indoor Championships finishing sixth in the 3000 metres. In addition, he won a bronze medal in the 5000 metres at the 2019 European U23 Championships.

International competitions

Personal bests
Outdoor
800 metres – 1:55.02 (Angoulême 2018)
1500 metres – 3:38.73 (Heusden-Zolder 2020)
3000 metres – 7:41.78 (Monaco 2022)
5000 metres – 13:10.95 (Göteborg 2021)
Indoor
3000 metres – 7:47.30 (Toruń 2021)

References

1997 births
Living people
French male middle-distance runners
French male long-distance runners
Athletes (track and field) at the 2020 Summer Olympics
Olympic athletes of France
21st-century French people